Qanat-e Kifteh (also Romanized as Qanāt-e Kīfteh and Qanāt Kīfteh; also known as Qanāt-e Gīfteh, Qanāt-e Kīfteh Gīvsīn, and Qanāt Gīfteh Gīveh Sīn Bālā) is a village in Padena-ye Vosta Rural District, Padena District, Semirom County, Isfahan Province, Iran. At the 2006 census, its population was 511, in 118 families.

References 

Populated places in Semirom County